DBS Bank (Hong Kong) Limited is a licensed bank incorporated in Hong Kong. It is a subsidiary of DBS Bank headquartered in Singapore and it is also the seventh-largest bank in Hong Kong by total assets.

History
In 1999, DBS Bank acquired Kwong On Bank and formed the DBS Kwong On Bank Limited. In 2001, DBS Bank acquired Dao Heng Bank, including its subsidiary, Overseas Trust Bank, from Guoco Group.

In 2003, DBS Bank merged the three banks, DBS Kwong On Bank Limited, Dao Heng Bank and Overseas Trust Bank, to form DBS Bank (Hong Kong).

Mei Foo Branch Incident
On October 5, 2004, DBS Bank (Hong Kong) Limited announced that, during the renovation of its branch in Mei Foo Sun Chuen, in Kowloon, when the bank attempted to remove more than 900 empty safety boxes from the branch, 83 safety boxes rented by customers and containing valuables were accidentally removed. The 83 boxes were subsequently sent to a scrapyard and crushed. The bank reported that 36 boxes were recovered, although the valuables contained inside were badly damaged.

In 2009, the safe deposit box incident was portrayed on TVB television series Born Rich.

Subsidiaries
DBS Asia Capital Limited 
DBS Asset Management (Hong Kong) Limited 
DBS Vickers Securities (Hong Kong) Limited 
DBS Vickers Securities (Singapore) Private Limited

See also 
List of banks in Hong Kong

References 

 Feng, Bangyan; (1861). A Century of Hong Kong Financial Development. Joint Publishing Hong Kong. .

DBS Bank
Banks of Hong Kong
Banks established in 1995